The 8th Politburo of the People's Movement for the Liberation of Angola (MPLA), officially the Political Bureau of the Central Committee of the MPLA elected at the 8th Congress, was elected at the 1st Plenary Session of the 8th Central Committee on 11 December 2021, and replaced the 7th Politburo that sat from 2019 to 2021.

At its 1st Ordinary Meeting, convened on 14 December 2021, the Politburo elected the 8th Secretariat and the 8th Council of Honor.

Of the 101, 48 are newcomers. Of these 48, 34 of them are women. 50 men and 51 women serve in the 8th Politburo.

Meetings

Members

References

External links
 MPLA Website

8th Politburo of the People's Movement for the Liberation of Angola